Oltion Rapa (born 30 September 1989) is an Albanian footballer who currently plays for SC Gjilani in the Football Superleague of Kosovo.

Honours
Luftëtari
Albanian First Division (1): 2015–16

References

External links
 Profile - FSHF

1989 births
Living people
People from Tepelenë
Albanian footballers
Association football defenders
KF Maliqi players
KF Memaliaj players
KF Butrinti players
Luftëtari Gjirokastër players
SC Gjilani players
Kategoria e Parë players
Kategoria Superiore players
Football Superleague of Kosovo players
Albanian expatriate footballers
Expatriate footballers in Kosovo
Albanian expatriate sportspeople in Kosovo